The Tizi Ouzou district is an Algerian administrative district in the Tizi-Ouzou province and the region of Kabylie .  Its chief town is located on the eponymous town of Tizi Ouzou.

Communes 
The daira is composed of only one commune: Tizi Ouzou.

The total population of the district is 135 088 inhabitants  for an area of 102.36 km2.

Localisation 
District borderings of the Tizi Ouzou District are Ouaguenoun, Azazga, Tizi Rached, Larbaâ Nath Irathen, Beni Douala, Maatkas, Draâ Ben Khedda and Draâ Ben Khedda.

Notable people
 Mohamed Belhocine, Algerian medical scientist, professor of internal medicine and epidemiology.

References 

Districts of Tizi Ouzou Province